Ustochrepts are a great group of soils, in the USDA soil taxonomy. They are classed in the sub-order Ochrepts, in the order Inceptisols

Ustochrepts are characterised by an ochric epipedon, a warm soil temperature regime and an ustic soil moisture regime.  Ochric epipedon refers to surface characteristics of the soils.  It is characterised as an upper surface with too little organic matter and light colour.

References
 Keys To Soil Taxonomy, Seventh edition, USDA 1996

Pedology
Types of soil